Bodapati Sumanth (born 10 May 1988) is an Indian first-class cricketer who plays for Andhra Pradesh.

References

External links
 

1988 births
Living people
Indian cricketers
Andhra cricketers
Cricketers from Visakhapatnam